Christos Yannaras (also Giannaras; ; born 10 April 1935) is a Greek philosopher, Eastern Orthodox theologian and author of more than 50 books which have been translated into many languages. He is a professor emeritus of philosophy at the Panteion University of Social and Political Sciences, Athens.

Biography
Yannaras was born in Athens. He studied theology at the University of Athens and philosophy at the University of Bonn (Germany) and the University of Paris (France). He received a Ph.D. from the Faculty of Theology at the Aristotle University of Thessaloniki (Greece). He holds also a Ph.D of the Faculté des Lettres et Sciences Humaines at the Sorbonne-University of Paris IV. He has been nominated Doctor of Philosophy, honoris causa, at the University of Belgrade, St. Vladimir's Seminary, New York, and the Holy Cross School, Boston. He has been a visiting professor at the universities of Paris (the Catholic Faculty), Geneva, Lausanne and Crete. He was Professor of Philosophy at the Panteion University of Social and Political Sciences in Athens, from 1982 to 2002. He is an elected member of the Hellenic Authors' Society.

The main volume of Yannaras' work represents a long course on study and research of the differences between the Greek and Western European philosophy and tradition, differences that are not limited at the level of theory only but also define a praxis (mode of life).

Selected bibliography 
In English
The Freedom of Morality, New York (SVS Press), 1984
Elements of Faith, Edinburgh (T&T Clark), 1991 
On the Absence and Unknowability of God: Heidegger and the Areopagite, London (Continuum, 2005)
Postmodern Metaphysics, Holy Cross Orthodox Press (Brookline, MA), 2004 table of contents
Variations on the Song of Songs, Holy Cross Orthodox Press (Brookline, MA), 2005  
Orthodoxy and the West, Holy Cross Orthodox Press (Brookline, MA), 2006
Person and Eros, Holy Cross Orthodox Press (Brookline, MA), 2008
The Meaning of Reality: Essays on Existence and Communion, Eros and History. Sebastian Press  (Los Angeles), 2011
Relational Ontology, Holy Cross Orthodox Press (Brookline, MA), 2011
The Enigma of Evil, Holy Cross Orthodox Press (Brookline, MA), 2012
Against Religion: The Alienation of the Ecclesial Event, Holy Cross Orthodox Press (Brookline, MA), 2013

Online textσ
"Pietism as an Ecclesiological Heresy" (Chapter 8 of The Freedom of Morality) 
"The Ethos of Liturgical Art" (Chapter 12 of The Freedom of Morality) 
"The inhuman character of human rights" (synopsis in English of the homonymous Greek book, published by Domos, Athens 1998) 
Yannaras' lecture on "Human rights and the Orthodox Church"
"Towards a New Ecumenism" 
 "A Note on Political Theory" (St. Vladimir's Theological Quarterly, 27:1 (1983), pp. 53–56) 
 "The Distinction Between Essence and Energies and its Importance for Theology" Athens, February, 1975. Translated from the Greek by the Rev. Peter Chamberas 
Read the chapter "Cantus Firmus" from the "Variations of the song of songs" in Greek"  or in English
First chapter of the author's book Orthodoxy and West in Modern Greece (in Greek)
Collection of numerous articles in Greek

References
 Zoumboulakis, Stavros (2010). Χριστιανοί στον δημόσιο χώρο: Πίστη ή πολιτιστική ταυτότητα;. Athens: "Hestia" Printing House.

Further reading
 Grigoropoulou, Evaggelia (2008): The early development of the thought of Christos Yannaras. Doctoral thesis, Durham University.
 Payne, Daniel P. (2006): The revival of political hesychasm in Greek Orthodox thought: a study of the hesychast basis of the thought of John S. Romanides and Christos Yannaras. Doctoral thesis, Baylor University.
 Williams, Rowan: The Theology of Personhood: A Study of the Thought of Christos Yannaras, from ”Sobornost” 6 (Winter 1972), pp. 415–430.
 Mitralexis, Sotiris: Person, Eros, Critical Ontology: An Attempt to Recapitulate Christos Yannaras’ Philosophy, from ”Sobornost” 34:1 (2012), pp. 33–40.
 Louth, Andrew: Some Recent Works by Christos Yannaras in English Translation, from “Modern Theology”, 25:2 (2009), pp. 329–340.
 Russell, Norman: Modern Greek Theologians and the Greek Fathers, from “Philosophy & Theology” 18,1 (2006): pp. 77–92.
 Papagiannopoulos, Ilias: Re-appraising the subject and the social in western philosophy and in contemporary orthodox thought, from “Studies in East European Thought” 58:4 (2006), pp. 299–330.

Book reviews 
"The Theology of personhood, a study of the thought of Christos Yannaras", a review of the book published afterwards under the title Person and Eros by Rowan Williams (a former Archbishop of Canterbury) in the journal Sobornost, No. 6, Winter 1972, pp. 415–430
A review of Elements of Faith by Nicholas Franck

External links 
 Christos Yannaras in the Saint Pachomius Library
 Christos Yannaras - OrthodoxWiki

1935 births
Living people
Eastern Orthodox writers
Eastern Orthodox theologians
Greek theologians
Greek writers
Greek philosophers
Eastern Orthodox philosophers
National and Kapodistrian University of Athens alumni
Aristotle University of Thessaloniki alumni
University of Bonn alumni
University of Paris alumni
Academic staff of Panteion University
Writers from Athens